Hans-Joachim Hannemann (5 April 1915 – 6 March 1989) was a German rower who competed in the 1936 Summer Olympics.

In 1936 he won the bronze medal as a member of Germany's boat team in the men's eight competition.

References

External links
Rudergesellschaft Wiking e.V.

1915 births
1989 deaths
Olympic rowers of Germany
Rowers at the 1936 Summer Olympics
Olympic bronze medalists for Germany
Olympic medalists in rowing
German male rowers
Medalists at the 1936 Summer Olympics
European Rowing Championships medalists